Testimonies is a 1952 novel, set in North Wales, by the English author Patrick O'Brian. It was first published in the UK under the title Three Bear Witness and in the US as Testimonies.

Although the book's first English reviews were not encouraging, its American reviews were quite different and in an influential article Delmore Schwartz highly praised the book at the expense of John Steinbeck, Evelyn Waugh, Angus Wilson and Ernest Hemingway.

Plot
The story is constructed from the testimonies that three witnesses give to an unnamed divine inquisitor: Joseph Aubrey Pugh, an Oxford don; Bronwen Vaughan, the woman he comes to love; and Mr Lloyd, a schoolmaster.

Pugh says that he had been expecting the visitation, and that he will do his best to set down in writing what had taken place. According to his testimony, having become exhausted and demoralised by his academic life in Oxford, Pugh decides to rent a small cottage in North Wales for an extended break, intending to spend his time walking in the hills and reading. He throws himself into his new life, becoming friends with Emyr, son of the elderly owners of the neighbouring farm of Gelli, Mr and Mrs Vaughan. He helps out at Gelli to the best of his ability, though he disapproves of Emyr using strychnine to poison the foxes that threaten the farm’s lambs. Gradually Pugh finds himself falling in love with Emyr’s wife, Bronwen. On receiving an unexpected bequest, he abandons his academic career and takes the cottage as his permanent home.

The schoolmaster, Mr Lloyd, tells the inquisitor that Bronwen had been brought up in a different valley and that she was "not our sort". After marrying and coming to live at Gelli with Emyr and his parents she had been considered "proud" and was unpopular with the local women.

Bronwen testifies that her marriage was initially good, and she had a child, but that she became scared of Emyr when he became violent toward her one night. As her fear and hatred of Emyr became increasingly evident, his mother turned against her and daily life at Gelli became very difficult.

Pugh falls ill and moves to Gelli to recuperate. There he spends hours talking to Bronwen, and his love for her deepens. Mr Lloyd’s cousin, a famous preacher by the name of Pritchard Ellis, comes to stay. He is revered by the local people for the power of his public oratory, but in private he is a hypocrite and sexual voyeur. After sexually touching Bronwen when they are alone, and being repulsed, he retaliates by spreading false rumours that Pugh and Bronwen are committing adultery. He preaches a powerful two-hour sermon in chapel denouncing Bronwen and Pugh's "wickedness", though without mentioning them by name, which results in their being ostracised by the community.

One night, Emyr is sexually violent to Bronwen again, and she tells the inquisitor that her husband nearly killed her. Pugh sees her the next day and realises what Emyr has done. He departs for a long and nightmarish walk through the mountains, contemplating suicide. Seriously injured, Bronwen is put to bed and a doctor is called. Old Mrs Vaughan comes in with some medicine and Bronwen, after taking a sip, realises immediately that it is laced with strychnine. She drinks it and dies. Pugh returns, utterly exhausted, and lies unconscious before being awakened to learn of Bronwen’s fate.

Background
The novel's setting is closely based on Cwm Croesor in North Wales, where O'Brian and his wife had rented a small cottage in 1945 as an escape from post-war London. The character of Pugh is semi-autobiographical, and his intended monograph The Bestiary Before Isidore of Seville was a subject that O'Brian later said he had himself been working on before the war. According to his step-son and biographer Nikolai Tolstoy, the fiction provided "the flimsiest of veils for [the author's] deepest personal concerns". He notes that Pugh – like O'Brian himself – "sets himself up as a gentleman and adopts a name more appropriate to his improved status, concerning which he resents being questioned."

Publication
The novel was first published in 1952, the UK version appearing under the title Three Bear Witness as O'Brian's publishers Secker & Warburg were of the view that his preferred title Testimonies would be difficult to sell. In the US it was published by Harcourt, Brace as Testimonies. Unaware that O'Brian had changed his name in 1945 from Richard Patrick Russ, many reviewers assumed the novel to be the author's first.

In 1994, the UK version was renamed Testimonies and re-published by HarperCollins with new cover art by Geoff Hunt, the cover-artist for the re-issued volumes of the Aubrey–Maturin series. Hunt illustrates a cottage almost identical with the real-life cottage in Cwm Croesor that O'Brian and his wife had rented in 1945. In the US the novel was reissued in 1993 by Norton.

A dramatised adaptation of the book by Colin Haydn Evans was broadcast on BBC Radio 4 in 2002.

Reception

The first English reviews were not encouraging. On 10 May 1952, an unnamed Times reviewer called the book "a slight and technically immature piece of work, loose-jointed and clumsy in construction to the point of amateurishness", though conceding that the book "leaves an impression of genuine talent". On 16 May the Times Literary Supplement called it "a quiet little story of much merit", while likewise considering its central literary device to be "clumsy".

The US reviews were entirely different. In an influential omnibus review in Partisan Review, Delmore Schwartz praised the book at the expense of John Steinbeck, Evelyn Waugh, Angus Wilson and Ernest Hemingway. Schwartz said: "To read a first novel by an unknown author which, sentence by sentence and page by page makes one say: he can't keep going at this pace, the intensity is bound to break down, the perfection of tone can't be maintained – is to rejoice in an experience of pleasure and astonishment ... [It] makes one think of a great ballad or a Biblical story ... The reader, drawn forward by lyric eloquence and the story's fascination, discovers in the end that he has encountered in a new way the sphinx and the riddle of existence itself." He concluded by comparing O'Brian's prose to the lyrics of the great Irish poet W. B. Yeats. In later editions of the book, part of Schwartz's review was reprinted as a preface.

The New York Herald Tribune Book Review called it "one of the finest books to come along for some time", while Saturday Review said that "Mr. O'Brian has made a story that moves to its end with the rightness and inevitability we think of as Greek." 

The New York Times Book Review dubbed the book "A rare and beautiful novel, deceptively modest in form, never faltering in the unobtrusive skill of its poetry and dramatic dimensions". The character of Bronwen was singled out for particular praise as "an altogether touching and marvelous woman, so persuasively and sympathetically portrayed that she deserves a place among great heroines – for all the differences of setting and scale, [she] has some of the stature of an Anna Karenina". The reviewer commented on the author's expert pacing of the story, his extraordinary gift for the visual scene, and his brilliant ear for the subtle counterpoint of sound in speech.

On the book's first publication, Kirkus Reviews considered the novel to be of "unassuming proportion and immaculate design". Reviewing the 1993 US re-issue, the magazine highlighted the author's "chaste and disciplined prose [that lends] purity to a quiet, tragic idyll for the discriminating reader".

The surnames Aubrey and Maturin – later to be used for the protagonists of O'Brian's Aubrey–Maturin series of nautical historical novels – both appear in Testimonies.

References

Bibliography

External links
 

1952 British novels
1952 in Wales
British autobiographical novels
Harcourt (publisher) books
HarperCollins books
Novels by Patrick O'Brian
Novels set in Wales
Secker & Warburg books